Leah Janine Blayney (born 4 July 1986) is  an Australian soccer coach and former player, who represented Boston Breakers in the American WPS. She played for Australia at the 2004 FIFA Under 19 Women's World Championship and 2006 FIFA Under 20 Women's World Championship. She is currently the head coach of the Australia women's national under-20 soccer team.

References

External links 

Auburn Tigers player profile
 

1986 births
Living people
Australian women's soccer players
Australian expatriate soccer players
Sydney FC (A-League Women) players
Boston Breakers players
Eskilstuna United DFF players
Australia women's international soccer players
Women's association football midfielders
Expatriate women's soccer players in the United States
Expatriate women's footballers in Sweden
Australian expatriate sportspeople in Sweden
Australian expatriate sportspeople in the United States
Auburn Tigers women's soccer players
Central Connecticut Blue Devils women's soccer players
Boston Aztec (WPSL) players
Women's Premier Soccer League players
People from the Blue Mountains (New South Wales)
Women's Professional Soccer players
Sportswomen from New South Wales
Soccer players from New South Wales